The Pakistan Navy Hydrographic Department (Reporting name: PN Hydrographic Department), is an active-duty and non-combatant naval administrative staff command, and one of the major science and technology command of the Pakistan Navy. The command served as the operational scientific naval oceanographic program for the Government of Pakistan and jointly conducts research and development programs with civilian National Institute of Oceanography.

Commissioned in 1959, the command is headquartered with the Naval Headquarters (NHQ) in Karachi, Sindh, and directly reported to Naval Surface Fleet (NFS). The command is mandate to conduct studies on hydrographic surveys of coastal and offshore waters of Pakistan, and publishing nautical charts and relevant publications. The command is commanded by one-star rank naval officer— a Commodore— who is designated as the Hydrographer of Pakistan Navy (HPN). The Hydrographer of Pakistan Navy acted and served as the chief naval hydrographer and consults and guide Chief of Naval Staff (CNS) on important matters of oceanographic science and technology. The current commander and Hydrographer of Pakistan Navy is CDRE Muhammad Arshad. The command is directly affiliated with International Hydrographic Organization and International Maritime Organization charged to deal and guide the United Nations with subjects related to Hydrography, Oceanography and safety of life at sea. The command is notable for providing its integral establishment for the planning and development of Pakistan Antarctic Programme and played an influential role in setting up the parameters, goals of research and development, technical direction for the Polar Research Cell of the Antarctic programme in 1990s.

Extension of Continental Shelf 

Pakistan Navy Hydrographic Department (PNHD) played a crucial role in the extension of EEZ of Pakistan. Pakistan Navy initiated the continental shelf extension case at ministerial level in 1995.

On 19 March 2015, UN Commission on continental shelf extension (UNCLCS) accepted Pakistan's case on continental shelf extension resultantly historic event occurred in the country's history when Pakistan became the only country in the region whose continental shelf is extended from 200 NM to 350 NM.

References

External links
Official Website

1959 establishments in Pakistan
Science and technology in Pakistan
Military units and formations established in 1959
Engineering units and formations of Pakistan
Pakistan Navy facilities
Commands of Pakistan Navy